David Ewe is a New Zealand former professional rugby league footballer who represented New Zealand.

Playing career
Ewe was a Wellington representative and played one match for the New Zealand national rugby league team in 1989 on a tour of Great Britain. He represented New Zealand Māori in the 1992 Pacific Cup and in 1993.

Later Years
In 2010 Ewe won the 50th Golden Shears pairs competition with Carl Cocks.

References

New Zealand rugby league players
New Zealand Māori rugby league players
New Zealand Māori rugby league team players
New Zealand national rugby league team players
Wellington rugby league team players
Upper Hutt Tigers players
Rugby league wingers
Rugby league centres
Living people
Year of birth missing (living people)